The Connecticut Air & Space Center is an aviation museum located near Igor I. Sikorsky Memorial Airport in Stratford, Connecticut that is focused on the history of aviation in Connecticut. Founded by George Gunther in 1998 after the closing of the Stratford Army Engine Plant, it currently occupies buildings 6 and 53 of the complex.

History 
The Army Engine Plant/Stratford (AEP/S) property is located at 550 South Main Street in Stratford, Connecticut. The 126-acre AEP/S property is occupied by a U.S. government-owned, contractor-operated manufacturing facility comprising numerous manufacturing buildings. The operator was Textron Lycoming, a Division of AVCO Corporation, a contractor to the U.S. Army Aviation Systems Command. The AEP/S property is bordered by industrial properties to the north; the Housatonic River to the east; a marsh which was a former landfill, to the south; and Igor I. Sikorsky Memorial Airport to the west.

Prior to 1927, the site was farmland. The property was developed in 1927 for Sikorsky Aircraft. In 1939, one of the world's first successful commercial helicopters, the Sikorsky VS-300, was developed in Stratford by Igor Sikorsky and flown at his plant. The Chance Vought Aircraft company designed and constructed the Vought F4U Corsair as well as several other seaplanes and fighters until they moved in 1949.  The Vought-Sikorsky Aircraft Division in Stratford built a total of 7,829 F4U fighters and these planes saw extensive combat in the Pacific Theatre of operations during World War II, and played a supporting role in the Korean War.  The Lycoming company produced Wright radial engines at the site and after World War II, the plant was converted to produce turbines.  The site was then owned by the Air Force through 1976. Ownership was transferred to the U.S. Army in 1976. Because of the Base Realignment and Closure actions of the United States Department of Defense, closure of the plant was recommended in July 1995. The plant closed in October 1998.
 The Connecticut Air & Space Center currently occupies the research and design hangar where all experimental testing was performed by Chance Vought from 1944 to 1948.

In 2012 the museum was damaged by Hurricane Sandy. In 2016, a Sikorsky S-76 was donated to the museum for use as a parts source. The museum opened a new addition to the Curtiss Hangar in May 2021. A plan to sell the airport in 2022 put plans for renovation and use of the Curtiss hangar in jeopardy.

Curtiss Hangar restoration 
Working with the Town of Stratford and City of Bridgeport, the Connecticut Air & Space Center was able to secure a 98-year lease for the dilapidated Curtiss aircraft hangar in 2015. It is the goal of the CASC to restore the structure. Groundbreaking for the restoration occurred in May 2016.

Restorations 
There are currently four major restorations in progress, including a pair of Sikorsky S-52 helicopters, one that is a Korean War (HO5S) veteran and another Civilian model (S-52).  The S-52, owned by the USMC, is currently being reassembled for display at the National Museum of the Marine Corps. The museum's own HO5S, while still missing several major components, has progressed to a point that it can sit on its own landing gear. The unique one-of-a-kind Sikorsky S-60 prototype has been undergoing a major restoration since 2010 when she was acquired from the New England Air Museum. The cockpit section is expected to be completed by 2018. Simultaneously the center section, wing spar, and rear fuselage section are all progressing as well with most of the torn wreckage removed and replaced with new metal.

In 2008 the museum was entrusted by the City of Bridgeport with the restoration of the former gate guard at the Sikorsky Memorial Airport, the much locally discussed Goodyear FG-1D Corsair. Work began in earnest and currently she is at the halfway point with completion expected around 2020. Many detailed components need to still be sourced and / or rebuilt.

In 2014 restoration was started on an OH-6 that served in the Vietnam War.

Collection 

 Bede BD-5
 Bell 47
 Cessna T-37B Tweet 57-2346
 Cessna O-2A Skymaster 67-21318
 Cessna 150L 15074606
 Christen Eagle II Serial #1
 Goodyear FG-1D Corsair 92460
 Hiller OH-23B Raven 51-16225
 Hughes OH-6A Cayuse 67-16477
 Lockheed T-33B 57-6558
 Northrop T-38A Talon 60-0900
 Sikorsky S-52
 Sikorsky S-52
 Sikorsky S-55 52-7573
 Sikorsky S-58
 Sikorsky S-60
 Sikorsky S-76A
 Whitehead No. 21 Replica

See also
List of aerospace museums

References

Notes

Bibliography

External links
 

Aerospace museums in Connecticut
Buildings and structures in Stratford, Connecticut
Museums in Fairfield County, Connecticut